Roads in China may refer to:
Expressways of China
China National Highways
Other streets and roads in China

See also
 History of transport in China